The 1943 Notre Dame Fighting Irish football team represented the University of Notre Dame during the 1943 college football season.  The Irish, coached by Frank Leahy, ended the season with 9 wins and 1 loss, winning the national championship. The 1943 team became the fourth Irish team to win the national title and the first for Frank Leahy. Led by Notre Dame's first Heisman Trophy winner, Angelo Bertelli, Notre Dame beat seven teams ranked in the top 13 and played seven of its ten games on the road. Despite a season ending loss to Great Lakes, Notre Dame was awarded its first national title by the Associated Press.

Schedule

Awards and honors
 Angelo Bertelli: Heisman Trophy

All-Americans

References

Notre Dame
Notre Dame Fighting Irish football seasons
College football national champions
Notre Dame Fighting Irish football